Hartmut Rohde (born 28 April 1966 in Hildesheim) is a German violist. He teaches at the Berlin University of the Arts.

External links
 hartmut-rohde.de - Official website
 biography at udk
 biography at naxos

1966 births
Living people
People from Hildesheim
German classical violists
Academic staff of the Berlin University of the Arts